Karl Molnar (born 18 May 1914; date of death unknown) was an Austrian sprint canoeist who competed in the late 1940s. At the 1948 Summer Olympics in London, he finished fourth in the C-2 10000 m event and fifth in the C-2 1000 m event.

References
Karl Molnar's profile at Sports Reference.com

1914 births
Austrian male canoeists
Canoeists at the 1948 Summer Olympics
Olympic canoeists of Austria
Year of death missing